Richmond Animal Protection Society (RAPS) is a no kill animal services agency in Richmond, British Columbia, Canada. RAPS operates the city animal shelter, a cat sanctuary, a fostering network, and a full-service animal hospital.

History

In 1989, Carol Reichert founded the Richmond Animal Protection Society (then Richmond Homeless Cats), the first organization in the Richmond area helping feral cats. At the time, feral cats were quickly killed upon entering local animal control pounds. Volunteers started to do trap–neuter–return of feral cats, including fostering and taming feral kittens, and fostering tame cats for adoption. There were soon 43 feeding stations for feral cats tended each day in Richmond and south Vancouver.

In 1999, space was donated for a shelter, which became the location of a cat sanctuary. To try to reduce the number of homeless pets, the organization subsidized spay/neuter surgery for low-income pet owners, helped people recover lost pets, and offered solutions to behavioural problems.

Determined to end needless euthanasia of animals, the organization bid on the municipal animal shelter contract in 2006. On February 1, 2007, RAPS took over operation of the City of Richmond animal shelter and implemented a no-kill policy for the animals regardless of age, medical needs or adoptability. The organization reports on its website that the "implementation of our no-kill philosophy has been very successful and we are finding safe and loving homes for hundreds of shelter animals." The same year, Reichert said, "We’ve proved that you can operate without killing. It’s twice the work for us, but it can be done, and it’s very rewarding to operate that way.”

By early 2012, in five years of running the municipal shelter, RAPS had "handled more than 2,000 dogs, 1,800 cats, 300 rabbits, 50 farm animals, 350 small animals (like birds, reptiles and ferrets) and temporarily housed 1,500 injured wildlife."  Reichert retired in April 2014 after 25 years of service.

The Richmond Animal Protection Society (RAPS) is a registered charity that operates the City of Richmond Animal Shelter and, independently, one of Canada's largest cat sanctuaries. RAPS is a no-kill organization.

Cat Sanctuary
The cat sanctuary, located on six acres (2.4 hectares) of suburban farmland, has been described as "Club Med for cats". There are two main buildings and twelve smaller ones, including a kitten house and two houses for cats with the feline immunodeficiency virus. Another area is provided for cats with the feline leukemia virus. "Enclosed decks on the main buildings provide indoor cats with access to fresh air and sunshine", while the "fenced outer yards and cedar cottages provide a safe haven and home to more than 200 cats who prefer an outdoor life." 

In 2014, the sanctuary housed approximately 640 cats, and is maintained by about 100 volunteers. "The cats' health is monitored by a highly specialized team of animal care workers who have been trained to handle and medicate feral cats, and who work closely with local veterinarians." 

The cat sanctuary is funded by private donations and revenues from the RAPS thrift store.

References

External links
 
 RAPS cat sanctuary

Animal welfare organizations based in Canada
Trap–neuter–return organizations
Domestic cat welfare organizations
No kill shelters